Rafael Inchauspe Méndez, known as Rafael de Nogales Méndez (October 14, 1877 in San Cristóbal, Táchira – July 10, 1937 in Panama City) was a Venezuelan soldier, adventurer and writer who served the Ottoman Empire during the Great War (1914–18). He travelled extensively and fought in many of the wars of his age.

Education and first conflicts
When a young man his father sent him to study in Europe and he attended Universities in Germany, Belgium and Spain, and spoke several languages fluently. Despite his education, Nogales felt more attracted to the military profession and he began to travel where the news of war took him. He took part in several conflicts in the last part of the 19th century and the beginning of the 20th: he fought for the Spanish against the Americans in the Spanish–American War. In 1902 with the support of president Zelaya of Nicaragua, Nogales participated in a failed attempt to overthrow Venezuelan dictator Cipriano Castro involving an expedition aboard the schooner La Libertad. The forces landed in La Guajira peninsula but were defeated by general Antonio Davila in Carazua as part of Revolución Libertadora of Venezuela. In 1904 participated in the Russo-Japanese War as a double agent.  Additionally, he spent time in Alaska during the time of the gold rush there. In California he fought with the forces of Mexican revolutionary Ricardo Flores Magón and also worked as a cowboy in Arizona. He returned to Venezuela in 1908, after the military coup of Juan Vicente Gómez that overthrew his enemy Cipriano Castro. Nogales was appointed by General Gómez as president of Apure State, however, he went into exile after making himself an enemy of the new president.

World War I
When World War I began, after unsuccessfully attempting to join a number of other European armies, he enlisted in the Ottoman Army and was assigned to the Caucasus Front, where he reached the rank of major. He led Ottoman Gendarmerie troops into battle against Armenian insurgents during the Siege of Van, but asked to be relieved due to what he believed were "unjustified massacres of Christians". He believed that the massacres were committed by Khalil Bey, the Commander and Chief of the Expeditionary Army he volunteered to serve with. He later wrote a book describing his experiences with the Ottoman Army in World War I.

In his book, de Nogales recounts the massacres of the Armenian population in Van during the Armenian genocide and wrote:

Nogales Méndez reported that the civil authorities found it preferable to murder at night with the help of local Kurds. When visiting Aghtamar, an island in Lake Van where the Armenian Cathedral of the Holy Cross is located, he notes that he uncovered the corpses of many priests.

Nogales Méndez visited Diyarbakir on June 26, 1915 and spoke with Mehmet Reşid, who was the governor of the province. During his time in Diyarbakir, he witnessed the massacres of the local Christian population of the province. According to his conversation with Reşid, the orders to massacre were sent from Interior Minister Talat Pasha. Nogales Méndez recounts in his memoirs that Reşid mentioned to him that he received a telegram directly from Talat Pasha ordering him to "Burn-Destroy-Kill".

After being transferred from the Caucasus, he saw action on the Sinai and Palestine Front. He fought in the Turkish lines during the entire war, and was awarded the Iron Cross by Kaiser Wilhelm II.

On one occasion during the Sinai and Palestine Campaign, he came face-to-face with Colonel T. E. Lawrence on the frontier. He and Lawrence looked at each other, then without speaking he and Lawrence parted with nothing to say. He was compared with T. E. Lawrence due to their works in Arabia despite their different uniforms.

Post-war years and death
After the war ended, he worked with the Nicaraguan revolutionary Augusto César Sandino. In London, Nogales wrote some books about his adventures around the world.

In 1936, after the death of Gómez, Nogales Méndez returned to Venezuela and was sent as commissioner to Panama to study the army of that country.

Nogales Méndez died in Panama City in 1937, age 59.

Books
Nogales Méndez wrote several books about his life experience.
Cuatro años bajo la Media Luna (1925), English title: Four Years Beneath the Crescent, about his experiences as an officer of the Ottoman Empire. The book includes details about the atrocities committed against the Armenian people by Turkish officials.
El saqueo de Nicaragua (1928), English title: The Looting of Nicaragua (1928)
Memorias de un Soldado de Fortuna (1932), English title: Memoirs of a Soldier of Fortune (1932)
Silk Hat and Spurs (1934, original in English), with a prologue by Field Marshal Edmund Allenby, who describes him as "a brave enemy, and now a trusty friend".

See also
Witnesses and testimonies of the Armenian genocide
 Recognition of the Armenian genocide
 Press coverage of the Armenian genocide
 Armenian genocide survivors
 T. E. Lawrence

References

Bibliography
 De Nogales, Rafael. Four Years Beneath The Crescent. London: Charles Scribner's Sons, 1926. Most recently republished as: Four Years Under the Crescent (Sterndale Classics (Gomidas Institute)) 
 De Nogales, Rafael. Memoirs of a soldier of Fortune. New York: Garden City Publishing Company, Inc., 1932. Recently republished in paperback.
 McQuaid, Kim, The Real and Assumed Personalities of Famous Men: Rafael De Nogales, T.E. Lawrence. and the Birth of the Modern Era, 1914–1937, London. Gomidas Institute, 2010,

External links
 
 .
 .

1879 births
1936 deaths
People from San Cristóbal, Táchira
Venezuelan soldiers
Ottoman Army officers
Ottoman military personnel of World War I
Spanish military personnel of the Spanish–American War
Venezuelan people of World War I
Venezuelan mercenaries
Witnesses of the Armenian genocide